Ban Chang Lo is one of five subdistricts (khwaeng) and namesake historic neighbourhood in Bangkok Noi District, Bangkok's Thonburi side (west bank of Chao Phraya River).

History
Its name meaning "Village of Caster", because people in this community have a history that dates back to the Thonburi and early Rattanakosin Kingdoms, their ancestors had a career in casting Buddha images. They are considered to be Buddha image casters with great versatility and worked in the royal court in many important royal ceremonies such as Royal Cremation Ceremony etc.

The area of the Ban Chang Lo in the past, was not very large. North, next to Phran Nok Road, south to Soi Itsaraphap 44 (Soi Saeng Sueksa), east to Khlong Ban Khamin, west to Phran Nok Market. The original house of the people in Ban Chang Lo was a traditional Thai wooden house with a gable roof and has a spacious area. Because it uses a large area in casting and mold making, most of the remaining areas therefore planted fruit trees or a vegetable garden. The area of Ban Chang Lo has a canal through to Chao Phraya River at Wat Rakhang nearby.

Latterly, because this community was close to Siriraj Hospital and the market (Wang Lang Market) which was location to people's houses. When they work sometimes there will be fire flakes spilled into them, which causes a fire. So, the government banned them from doing this career again and to move away from living area. At present, those who have a casting Buddha image have moved to open the foundries and shops along Phran Nok Road near Fai Chai Intersection.

Geography
Ban Chang Lo covers the central-southern area of Bangkok Noi, with a total area of 2.076 km2 (round about 0.801 mi2), regarded as the third largest subdistrict of Bangkok Noi (after Bang Khun Si and Arun Amarin).

The area is bordered by neighbouring subdistricts (from north clockwise): Bang Khun Si and Siriraj in its district (Charan Sanitwong Road, Southern Railway Line, Khlong Wat Thong and Sutthawat Road are the borderlines), Siriraj in its district (Itsaraphap Road, Wang Lang Road and Khlong Ban Khamin are the borderlines), Wat Arun and Wat Tha Phra of Bangkok Yai District (Khlong Mon is a borderline), Bang Khun Si in its district (Charan Sanitwong Road is a borderline).

Nowadays, the area opposite Wat Wiset Kan's gate with a blue sign indicating Ban Chang Lo Community installed on Wang Lang Road, which is an alley connects to Soi Itsaraphap 44 and leads to other communities and places such as Ban Khamin, Trok Matum (Soi Arun Amarin 23), Thonburi Hospital and Navy Park Club.

References

Bangkok Noi district
  Subdistricts of Bangkok
Neighbourhoods of Bangkok